Octomeria pinicola is a species of orchid found from Brazil to Argentina (Misiones).

References

External links 

pinicola
Orchids of Argentina
Flora of Misiones Province
Orchids of Brazil